Kayl railway station is a railway station serving Kayl, in south-western Luxembourg.  It is operated by Chemins de Fer Luxembourgeois, the state-owned railway company.

The station is situated on Line 60, which connects Luxembourg City to the Red Lands of the south of the country.  Kayl is the first stop on a branch line that, splitting from the main line at Noertzange, leads to Rumelange.

External links

 Official CFL page on Kayl station
 Rail.lu page on Kayl station

Railway
Railway stations in Luxembourg
Railway stations on CFL Line 60